ZUM may refer to:
 Churchill Falls Airport
 Z User Meeting
Zimbabwe Unity Movement
 Zone Usage Measurement
 Zum (app)

Places 
Zum, Iran, a village in Kurdistan Province
Züm bus rapid transit in Brampton, Ontario, Canada